A Vulnerability Discovery Model (VDM) uses discovery event data with software reliability models for predicting the same.    A thorough presentation of VDM techniques is available in.  Numerous model implementations are available in the MCMCBayes open source repository.  Several VDM examples include:

Alhazmi-Malaiya: Time based model (Alhazmi-Malaiya Logistic (AML) model)
Alhazmi-Malaiya: Effort based model
Rescorla: Quadratic Model and Exponential Model 
Anderson: Thermodynamic Model
Kim: Weibull Model
Linear Model
Hump-Shaped Model
Independent and Dependent Model
Vulnerability Discovery Modeling using Bayesian model averaging
Multivariate Vulnerability Discovery Models

See also

 Attack (computing)
 Computer security
 Information security
 IT risk
 Threat (computer)
 Vulnerability (computing)

References

Computer security
System software